Reginald Earle Welby, 1st Baron Welby GCB, PC (3 August 1832 – 30 October 1915) was a British peer, former Permanent Secretary to the Treasury and former President of the Royal Statistical Society.

Early life and education
Born in his father's rectory at Harston in Leicestershire, he was the seventh child of the Reverend John Earle Welby (1786–1867), a younger son of Sir William Earle Welby, 1st Baronet. His mother was Felicia Elizabetha Hole (1797–1888), the daughter of the Reverend Humphrey Aram Hole (1763–1814) and his wife Sarah Horne (1775–1853), daughter of George Horne, Bishop of Norwich. His younger sister, Felicia Elizabetha Welby (1835–1927), became the wife of Montague Bertie, 11th Earl of Lindsey.

Welby was educated at Eton College where he became known amongst his friends as a "great footballer". He then went up to Trinity College, Cambridge, hoping for a career as a barrister following graduation, although his hopes never realised themselves. Instead he entered the Civil Service as a clerk in the Treasury in 1856 having graduated from Cambridge in 1855.

Career

Welby held many posts during his tenure at the Treasury and was appointed Assistant Financial Secretary in 1880. In 1885, he succeeded Lord Lingen as Permanent Secretary to the Treasury, holding this office until his retirement in 1894. Following his retirement, he was raised to the peerage as Baron Welby, of Allington in the County of Lincoln, on 16 April 1894, although he did not play a great part in debates in the House of Lords. He was appointed a member of the Privy Council in 1913. Lord Welby also became an alderman of London County Council, eventually becoming its Chairman, and served as President of the International Free Trade Congress.

Personal life
Lord Welby was involved in a motorcar accident in December 1914, which he recovered from; however, his subsequent instability caused his death in the autumn of 1915. A bachelor, he left no heir and the barony expired on his death.

Titles and honours

 Mr Reginald Welby (1832–1874)
 Mr Reginald Welby CB (1874–1882)
 Sir Reginald Welby KCB (1882–1892)
 Sir Reginald Welby GCB (1892–1894)
 The Rt. Hon. The Lord Welby GCB (1894–1913)
 The Rt. Hon. The Lord Welby GCB PC (1913–1915)

References

External links

 yes

1832 births
1915 deaths
People educated at Eton College
Alumni of Trinity College, Cambridge
Barons in the Peerage of the United Kingdom
Members of London County Council
Members of the Privy Council of the United Kingdom
Presidents of the Royal Statistical Society
Knights Grand Cross of the Order of the Bath
Progressive Party (London) politicians
Peers of the United Kingdom created by Queen Victoria